The Department of the Director of Dockyards, also known as the Dockyard Branch and later as the Dockyards and Fleet Maintenance Department, was the British Admiralty department responsible from 1872 to 1964 for civil administration of dockyards, the building of ships, the maintenance and repair of ships at dockyards and factories, and the supervision of all civil dockyard personnel.

History
Originally, responsibility for the civil management of Royal Navy Dockyards lay with the Navy Board, and in particular the Surveyor of the Navy who supervised the Navy Board's resident commissioners of the navy based at each individual yard. Following the abolition of the Navy Board in 1832, responsibility for administration of the yards passed to the Board of Admiralty. The resident commissioners were replaced by yard superintendents, however they were primarily responsible for military administration of the yards.

The Surveyor of the Navy survived the re-organisation until 1869, when his office was merged with that of the Third Naval Lord to become Controller of the Navy. Between 1850 and 1861, the dockyards had been subject to an investigation into management practices; the committee responsible for the investigation concluded that under the existing system was completely inefficient. In 1872, to ease the burden of work on the Controller and to action reforms suggested by the inquiry, a Surveyor of Dockyards was appointed to answer these criticisms. He was originally supervised by the Director of Naval Construction, who was responsible for both design and construction, and also dockyard work.

In December 1885 the post of Surveyor of Dockyards was abolished and replaced by a Director of Dockyards.  The new Director was instructed to visit the dockyards frequently, "for the purpose of conferring personally with the superintendents and officers in regard to the ships and works in progress." However, inefficiencies led to a recommendation by George Robinson, Lord Ripon in which he suggested there should be a separation of the functions and duties of the naval design and construction branches, which would remain distinct from each other, and that the branches should both coordinate and operate a sort of checks and balance system. A set of instructions issued on 28 May 1886 communicated that the Director of Dockyards would no longer be subordinate to the Director of Naval Construction. Instead, he was made solely responsible to the Controller for the building of ships at dockyards, and for the maintenance and repair of ships, of boats, and of all steam machinery in ships, boats, dockyards, and factories. In 1892 the post of Director of Dockyards was changed to Director of Dockyards and Works until 1913, when it was again renamed to Director of Dockyards and Repair.

During and after World War One, from 1917 to 1919, further restructuring with the Admiralty took place with the creation of the post of Deputy Controller for Dockyards and Shipbuilding, to which the Director of Dockyards and Repairs would now report to. The department under this name would remain in place until 1957, when it was renamed Dockyards and Fleet Maintenance Department under the control of a Director-General until 1964. Following the merger of the Admiralty into a new and much larger Ministry of Defence under the Navy Department, it was again renamed as the Department of Dockyards and Maintenance until 1968. In 1969, overall responsibility for dockyards changed, and now came under the control of a new Chief Executive, Royal Dockyards. who was head of the Royal Dockyards Management Board.

Duties
A director's duties included:
 assisting the Controller in the preparation of the estimates for plant and machinery required for all naval establishments;
 exercising control of naval expenditure at all home yards;
 exercising control of naval expenditure at all overseas yards;
 general management of the dockyards at home and the naval yards abroad;
 managing the economical performance of the dockyards at home and the naval yards abroad;
 preparing annual programmes of work (subject to approval in the dockyards at home and the naval yards abroad;
 preparing of the Navy Estimates, to determine the work to be done in the dockyards;
 regulating the number, appropriation, and pay of the men, and the supply of necessary materials through the Director of Stores, in accordance with the approved shipbuilding programme;
 submitting proposals relative to necessary works to be carried out in the yards by the Department of the Director of Works;
 superintending the building of ships and boats of all classes;
 superintending the proper maintenance and repairing of ships and their machinery, and the keeping of vessels up to the approved standard; and 
 supplying relevant machinery and appliances and provide instruction of the use of both in the yards and factories, as well as in the victualling yards.

Incumbents
Head of Department included:

Surveyor of Dockyards
 Sir Frederick Barnes, 1872 - December 1885)

Director of Dockyards
 Sir Frederick Barnes, December 1885 - February 1886  
 Dr. Francis Elgar, February 1886 - 1892

Director of Dockyards and Works
 Sir James Williamson, 1892 - July 1905) 
 Sir James B. Marshall, July 1905- March 1913

Director of Dockyards and Repair
 Sir James B. Marshall, March 1913- April 1917 
 Vice-Admiral Sir Laurence Eliot Power, 1 June 1917 – 31 March 1923 
 Admiral Sir. Brian H. F. Barttelot, March, 1923 – 1 March 1928 
 Admiral Sir. Albert P. Addison, 1 March 1928 – 1 May 1937 
 Vice-Admiral Sir. Cecil P. Talbot, 1 May 1937 – 20 December 1946 
 Admiral Sir. Claud B. Barry, 20 December 1946 - 31 December 1951 
 Vice-Admiral. Sir. W. York La Roche Beverley, 31 December 1951 - 19 July 1954 
 Vice-Admiral, Sir. A. Gordon V. Hubback, 19 July 1954 - 31 December 1957

Director-General of Dockyards and Maintenance
 Rear-Admiral, Peter D. H. R. Pelly, 2 January 1958  - December 1959
 Vice-Admiral Sir. Reginald Thomas Sandars, December 1959  - 19 May 1962 
 Rear-Admiral W. A. Haynes, 19 May 1962 - April 1964 
Note: RADM Haynes remained as Director-General, Dockyards and Maintenance with the new Ministry of Defence from May 1964 until 1969.

Structure of Department
As of Spring 1962 
 Office of the Director-General Dockyards and Maintenance ---------- Office of the Civil Assistant to the Director-General Dockyards and Maintenance
 Divisions
 Dockyards
 Construction Departments
 Draughting Departments
 Electrical Departments
 Engineering Departments
 Maintenance Departments
 Salvage Departments
 Training Sections
Dockyard Division
Office of the Director Dockyard Division
Office of the Deputy Director Dockyard Division
Office of the Assistant Director Dockyard Division, Ships
Office of the Assistant Director Dockyard Division, Shore
Office of the Assistant Director Dockyard Division, Management Techniques
Office of the Assistant Director Dockyard Division, General
Office of the Assistant Director Dockyard Division, Nuclear
Office of the Assistant Director Dockyard Division, Personnel
Office of the Assistant Director Dockyard Division, Finance
Office of the Chief Constructor
Office of the Chief Draughtsman
Office of the Superintending Mechanical Engineer
Telecommunications Section
Management Training Section
Fleet Maintenance Division
Office of the Director Fleet Maintenance Division
Office of the Deputy Director Fleet Maintenance Division
Office of the Assistant Director Fleet Maintenance Division
Office of the Assistant Director Fleet Maintenance Division, Constructive

Marine Services Division
Office of the Director Marine Services Division
Office of the Deputy Marine Services Maintenance Division
Office of the Assistant Director Marine Services Division
Civil Staff Department (officer's responsible for boom defences, examiner of works, moorings, salvage, moorings)
Yard Machinery District, Scottish
Yard Machinery District, Northern
Yard Machinery District, Midland
Yard Machinery District, Southern
Naval Dockyards
Yards operating from 1860 onward during the existence of this department included.
Antigua Yard.
Ascension Yard.
Bermuda Yard.
Bombay Yard.
Chatham Yard.
Colombo Yard.
Deptford Yard.
Devonport Yard.
Devonport Yard, NZ.
Esquimalt, Yard.
Gibraltar Yard.
Halifax Yard.
Haulbowline Yard.
Invergordon Yard.
Jamaica Yard.
Lyness Yard.
Madras Yard.
Malta Yard.
Pembroke Yard.
Plymouth Yard.
Portland Yard.
Portsmouth Yard.
Rosyth Yard.
Scapa Flow Yard.
Sheerness Yard.
Simonstown Yard.
Singapore Yard.
Sydney Yard.
Trincomalee Yard.
Wei Hai Wei Yard.
Woolwich Yard.

Timeline
 Navy Board, Surveyor of the Navy, Dockyard Commissioners, 1546-1832
 Board of Admiralty, Surveyor of the Navy, Dockyard Branch, 1832-1860
 Board of Admiralty, Department of the Surveyor of Dockyards, 1872-1885
 Board of Admiralty, Department of the Director of Dockyards, 1885-1958
 Board of Admiralty, Dockyards and Maintenance Department, 1958-1964
 Ministry of Defence, Navy Department, Department of Dockyards and Maintenance, 1964-1968
 Ministry of Defence, Navy Department, Chief of Fleet Support Department, Department of Dockyards, 1969-1971.

References
Citations

Sources
 Archives. The National. (1690-1981) "Records of Dockyards". discovery.nationalarchives.gov.uk. National Archives. ADM 312.
 Brassey, Earl Thomas Allnutt (1909). Brassey's Annual: The Armed Forces Year-book. Praeger Publishers.
  Coats, Dr Anne; Davies, Dr David.  (2015) "20TH CENTURY NAVAL DOCKYARDS: DEVONPORT AND PORTSMOUTH CHARACTERISATION REPORT". Historic England. Naval Dockyards Society.
  Committee on Naval Affairs, United States. Congress. House (1910). Hearings on the Proposed Reorganization of the Navy Department Before the Committee on Naval Affairs of the House of Representatives [December 16, 1909 to February 17, 1910. U.S. Government Printing Office. 
 Government H.M. "The Navy List" (various 1869 to 1970), H.M. Stationery Office. London. England
 Hamilton, Sir Vesey (1896). "IV". The Constitution, Character and Functions of the Board of Admiralty and the Civil Departments it Directs. George Bell and Sons. .
 Haas, J. M. (1994). A Management Odyssey: The Royal Dockyards, 1714-1914. University Press of America. .
 Harley, Simon; Lovell, Tony. (2016) "Director of Dockyards and Repair (Royal Navy) - The Dreadnought Project". dreadnoughtproject.org. Harley and Lovell' .
 Leggett, Don (2015). Shaping the Royal Navy: Technology, Authority and Naval Architecture, C.1830-1906. Oxford University Press. .
 Puddefoot, Geoff (2010). Ready For Anything: The Royal Fleet Auxiliary 1905-1950. Seaforth Publishing. .
 Rodger, N.A.M. (1979). The Admiralty. Offices of State. Lavenham: T. Dalton. .
 Winfield, Rif (2014). British Warships in the Age of Sail 1817-1863: Design, Construction, Careers and Fates. Seaforth Publishing. .

Admiralty departments
Admiralty during World War I
Admiralty during World War II
1872 establishments in the United Kingdom
1964 disestablishments in the United Kingdom